Humbugs are a traditional hard boiled sweet available in the United Kingdom, Ireland, South Africa, Canada, Australia, and New Zealand. They are usually flavoured with peppermint and striped in two different colours (often black and white). In Australia, the black and white striped humbugs are flavoured aniseed and sold at all major supermarkets. Humbugs may be cylinders with rounded ends wrapped in a twist of cellophane, or more traditionally tetrahedral formed from pinched cylinders with a 90-degree turn between one end and the other (shaped like a pyramid with rounded edges) loose in a bag. Records of humbugs exist from as early as the 1820s, and they are referred to in the 1863 book Sylvia's Lovers as being a food from the North.

Manufacture
This mixture is then poured out, and stretched and folded many times. The stripes originate from a smaller piece of coloured mixture which is folded into the main mixture. The mixture is finally rolled into a long, thin cylinder and sliced into segments.

Bulls-eyes

A similar sweet is "bulls-eye" which has red and white or black and white stripes . These are peppermint flavoured and are also known as bullets in the UK as they are similar in size to smoothbore musket balls.

Everton mints
Another popular mint in the UK is the Everton mint, which is also striped black and white with a toffee centre. Its origins are thought to lie in a coffee shop in the Everton district of Liverpool and gives Everton F.C. its nickname of "The Toffees". The mints are distributed nationally through various manufacturers and brandings, the best known of which being Bassett's.

See also
1858 Bradford sweets poisoning

Gobstopper

References

British confectionery
Candy
Victorian cuisine